Dubensky District or Dubyonsky District is the name of several administrative and municipal districts in Russia.
Dubyonsky District, Republic of Mordovia, an administrative and municipal district of the Republic of Mordovia
Dubensky District, Tula Oblast, an administrative and municipal district of Tula Oblast

See also
Dubensky (disambiguation)

References